Shah Hussain (1538–1599), also known as Madhoo Lal Hussain, was a 16th-century Punjabi Muslim Sufi poet who is regarded as a pioneer of the Kafi form of Punjabi poetry. He lived during the ruling periods of Mughal emperors Akbar and his son Jahangir.

Name
Shah Hussain is also often known as Shah Hussain Faqir - Faqir meaning Dervish (mendicant) and Shah means King. So due to his extremely humble Sufi personality, people called him The Dervish King, a person who was a King and a Dervish at the same time.

Life
He was born in 945 AH (1538) within the Walled City of Lahore in what is now Punjab, Pakistan. His father was Sheikh Usman, he was a Dhudhi Rajput
(a clan of Rajput), and by occupation, he was a weaver (in some of Shah Hussain poetic rhymes he used his pen name as Faqir Hussain Julaha which means "Humble/Poor/Saint Hussain the weaver"), his father, in his early age, enrolled him in a local school where he started to memorize the Quran. His teacher was Hafiz Abubakar. It was 955 AH (1548) when at the age of 10, a renowned Sufi master Sheikh Bahlol Qadri (d. 983 AH/ 1575) met him who later became his mentor. One day in the month of Ramadan his mentor asked him to fetch water for him from river and there he met Al-Khidr (Green One) who blessed him and Shah Hussain recited the whole Quran in Tarawih prayer while he memorized only 7 parts of the Quran, this miracle news spread in the city, Sheikh Bahlol, after some time, went to his town and directed Shah Hussain to regularly visit the Ali Hijwiri shrine in Lahore, Shah Hussain regularly at night stands in the river Ravi and recites the whole Quran until Fajar prayer and then visits to the shrine of Ali Hijwiri and till Zohar prayer recites whole Quran and he never missed a single congregation prayer, he also studied Tafsir Quran from a famous scholar Sheikh Saadullah Lahori in the year 981 AH (1573). While he was studying the Tafsir, he suddenly went out of the mosque and abandoned the path of ascetic and stepped into the path of self-blamers and became a self-blamer Sufi, he started to dance and drink in public, some slandered him, and some had faith in him.

Sheikh Madho Lal, the love of Shah Hussain, born in 983 AH (1575), when for the first time looked at his matchless beauty and fell for him, it was the love at first sight. At the time, Sheikh Madho was 16 years of age and Shah Hussain was 54 years old in the year 999 AH (1590). Sheikh Madho, at the age of 18 in 1002 AH (1593), embraced Islam and became a Muslim. Shah Hussain raised him as his vicegerent and became his spiritual master. Shah Hussain died at 63 years of age in 1008 AH (1599), and before his death, he predicted that his first shrine will be built in Shahdara (located near river Ravi), then after 12 years a flood will appear in the river that will reach to my shrine and then my grave will be shifted to Babu Pura (now Baghbanpura in Lahore; the Shalimar gardens) and my beloved Madho Lal will sit on my seat for 48 years after my death and it happened as the saint predicted, Sheikh Madho Lal, for the rest of his life, followed the footsteps of Shah Hussain and completely secluded himself from the world and confined himself into the shrine of his master Shah Hussain and in 1056 AH (1647) at the age of 73 died and was buried next to Shah Hussain.

Two great Sufi saints, Syed Daud Bandagi Kirmani Qadri (899 AH-982 AH/1484-1574) and his disciple Syed Abu Ishaq Qadri (d. 985 AH/1577), were close friends of Shah Hussain and renowned scholars of his time. Mullah Abdul Hakim Sialkoti and Sheikh Tahir Bandagi Naqshbandi had great honour and respect for him.

Notable books written on his life include Risala Baharia (by Bahar Khan on the directions of Emperor Jahangir), Hasanat ul Arifin (by Prince Dara Shiko in 1653), Haqiqat ul Fuqra (by Syed Sheikh Mahmood in 1662), Miftahul Arifin (by Abdul Fatah Naqshbandi Mujadad in 1667), along with others.

Shrine
His tomb and shrine is located at the Baghbanpura precincts, adjacent to the Shalimar Gardens Lahore, Pakistan. His Urs (annual death anniversary) is celebrated at his shrine every year during the "Mela Chiraghan" ("Festival of Lights"). Madho's tomb lies next to Hussain's in the shrine.

In the 18th century, during Maharaja Ranjit Singh (1780 – 1839) rule of Punjab, the maharaja himself would lead a procession from his palace in Lahore to Shah Hussain's shrine barefoot during Mela Chiraghan (Festival of Lights), accompanied by thousands of Sikhs, Muslims and Hindus. Shah Hussain's urs and the mela used to happen at two different times but were both combined into one and then called "Mela Chiraghan" (Festival of Lights) by Ranjit Singh. This mela (festival) is considered to be the biggest festival of Punjab.

Kafis of Shah Hussain
Hussain's works of poetry consist entirely of short poems known as Kafis. A typical 'Hussain Kafi' contains a refrain and some rhymed lines. The number of rhymed lines is usually between four and ten. Only occasionally is a longer form adopted. Hussain's Kafis are also composed for, and the singing of them has been set to music based on Punjabi folk music. Many of his Kafis are part of the traditional Qawwali repertoire. His poems have been performed as songs by Kaavish, Nusrat Fateh Ali Khan, Abida Parveen, Ghulam Ali, Hamid Ali Bela, Amjad Parvez, Junoon and Noor Jehan, among others. 

"It may be asserted that poetry is often written to be sung. And all poetry carries, through manipulation of sound effects, some suggestion of music".

Here are three examples, which draw on the famous love story of Heer Ranjha: 

Another Kafi: 

Two Kafis that are addressed to his Hindu disciple Madho Lal Hussain need a special mention:

See also
List of Punjabi language poets
Qawwali

References

Further reading
 Great Sufi Poets of The Punjab, by R. M. Chopra, Iran Society, Kolkata, 1999.
 Verses of a Lowly Fakir poetry of Madho Lal Hussein translated by Naveed Alam 2016.

External links
 Complete works of Shah Hussain in Punjabi (Shahmukhi) language, Academy of the Punjab in North America (APNA) website

Punjabi Sufi saints
Sufi poets
Punjabi-language poets
1538 births
1599 deaths
Sufism in Pakistan
Sufi shrines in Pakistan
Shrines in Pakistan
Punjabi people
Punjabi Sufis
People from Lahore